KRSJ (100.5 FM) is a radio station broadcasting a country music format. Licensed to Durango, Colorado, United States, the station serves the Four Corners area. The station is currently owned by Four Corners Broadcasting, LLC and features programming from Fox News Radio and play-by-play of the Denver Broncos and the Colorado Avalanche. First licensed in January of 1973, KRSJ is the Four Corners Heritage Country Station serving listeners in four states. Colorado, Arizona, Utah, and New Mexico

References

External links
 Official Website
 

Country radio stations in the United States
RSJ